Einar Østvedt (30 November 1903 – 11 April 1980) was a Norwegian historian and educator.

Einar Østvedt was born in Skien in Telemark, Norway. During 1927-1928, he was  resident student at the University of Besançon.  He studied at the University of Oslo, graduating with his cand.philol. degree in 1930 and dr.philos. in 1946.  He worked as a teacher in Skien from 1931 to 1971, except for a number of leaves. He studied in the United Kingdom in 1948, Harvard University in 1955, at Rome in 1963 and Copenhagen during 1964.

He published the book Telemark i norsk malerkunst in 1942, with illustrations by Harald Kihle. In 1946 he published his diaries from imprisonment during the occupation of Norway by Nazi Germany. His thesis from 1946 was a treatment on Christian Magnus Falsen. In 1963 he published a biography of Dyre Vaa, and also the book Fløtning i Telemark gjennom 300 år. He wrote several works on Henrik Ibsen, including twelve books. He was decorated Knight, First Class of the Order of St. Olav in 1978.

Selected works
Hermann Bagger som redaktør og politiker (1932)
Straff og samhold. En dagbok fra lærernes Kirkenesferd (1942) 
Telemark i norsk malerkunst (1942)
Frits Thaulow (1951)
August Cappelens brev (1952) 
Henrik Ibsen og la bella Italia (1965)
Henrik Ibsen og hans barndomsmiljø (1966) 
Telemark i norsk billedhuggerkunst (1967)
Henrik Ibsen. Miljø og mennesker (1968) 
Peer Gynt. Mennesker og motiver (969)
Mogens Heinessøn. Et Ibsen-skuespill som aldri ble skrevet (1969)
Skien gymnas gjennom halvannet sekel (1972)
Henrik Ibsen. Barndom og ungdom (1973)
Henrik Ibsen og hans venner (1974)
På gamle tufter. Ti Telemarksprofiler (1975)
Et dukkehjem. Forspillet. Skuespillet. Etterspillet (1976)
 Den siste glede. Ni noveller (1979)

References

1903 births
1980 deaths
People from Skien
20th-century Norwegian historians
Norwegian biographers
Male biographers
Norwegian diarists
20th-century Norwegian male writers
20th-century diarists